The Governor L.D. Lewelling House is a historic house located at 1245 North Broadway in Wichita, Kansas, United States. It was listed on the National Register of Historic Places on June 8, 2005.

Description and history 
The -story house was built in about 1894. It was deemed significant for its association with Lorenzo D. Lewelling while he served as governor of Kansas and architecturally as "a good example of a Colonial Revival-styled four square with Queen Anne and Shingle style influences."

References

Houses on the National Register of Historic Places in Kansas
Colonial Revival architecture in Kansas
Houses completed in 1894
Buildings and structures in Wichita, Kansas
Houses in Sedgwick County, Kansas
National Register of Historic Places in Wichita, Kansas
American Foursquare architecture